Rainhill is a civil parish in St Helens, Merseyside, England.  It contains 20 buildings that are recorded in the National Heritage List for England as designated listed buildings.   Of these, two are listed at  Grade II*, the middle of the three grades, and the others are at Grade II, the lowest grade.  The parish was originally rural, and within it was a coaching stop on the turnpike road between Liverpool and Warrington.  Following the arrival of the Liverpool and Manchester Railway in the 1830s, the settlements of Rainhill and Rainhill Stoops grew, and merged to become a dormitory residential area.  The listed buildings include farmhouses and farm buildings, and large houses that have been converted for later uses.  Associated with the railway are its skew bridge and the station.  The other listed buildings include churches, a school, an ancient cross, and a water tower.

Key

Buildings

References

Citations

Sources

http://www.historicengland.org.uk/listing/what-is-designation/listed-buildings/

Listed buildings in Merseyside
Lists of listed buildings in Merseyside
Buildings and structures in the Metropolitan Borough of St Helens